Baizi Yangxin Wan is a brown to dark brown pill used in Traditional Chinese medicine to "replenish qi and blood and induce sedation". It is used in cases where there is "deficiency of cold syndrome of the heart marked by cardiac palpitation, vulnerability to fright, insomnia, dream-disturbed sleep and forgetfulness". A honey solution is used as the binding agent.

Chinese classic herbal formula

See also
 Chinese classic herbal formula
 Bu Zhong Yi Qi Wan

References

Traditional Chinese medicine pills